Scorpions and Miniskirts or Chinos y minifaldas or Death on a Rainy Day is a 1967 Italian/Spanish/West German international co-production Eurospy comedy action martial arts film shot in New York, Hong Kong, Paris and in studios in Rome and Madrid. Directed by Ramón Comas, the film stars Adrian Hoven who co-produced the film with his partner Pier Andrea Caminneci in the second film of their Aquila Film Enterprises.  The film also stars Barth Warren in his film debut and George Wang; a Chinese actor playing an Oriental mastermind. The film was written by Keith Luger, the pen name of prolific Spanish pulp fiction Michael Oliveros Tovar (1924-1985); the film being his first screenplay.

Plot
A Kommissar X type pair of French secret agents from the Strategic Investigation Bureau investigate the death of an agent in Hong Kong who sent a bottle of perfume to Paris.  The pair uncover a plot by Dr. Kung, a Fu Manchu type Chinese mastermind and his secret society of the Red Scorpion.  Dr Kung seeks to start a third world war by injecting the brain of the United States Secretary of Defense with RNA that will cause him to do Dr. Kung's bidding.

Cast
Adrian Hoven ... 	Paul Riviere
Barth Warren 	... 	Bruno Nussak
Gérard Landry ... 	Commander Fernion
Teresa del Río ... 	Sonia Bellford 
Claudia Gravy ... 	Shantung
Lilia Neyung 	... 	Leila Wong
Karin Feddersen ... 	Françoise Moreau
	George Wang 	... Dr. Kung
Josyane Gibert ... Pamela 
Wolfgang Preiss ... Dr. Angus Cromwell

References

External links
 

1967 films
Spanish spy comedy films
German spy comedy films
Italian spy comedy films
Italian buddy comedy films
1960s spy comedy films
Films scored by Piero Umiliani
Films shot in Paris
Films shot in Hong Kong
Films shot in New York City
1960s buddy comedy films
1967 comedy films
1960s Italian films
1960s German films